is a train station in Miyakonojō, Miyazaki Prefecture, Japan. It is operated by JR Kyushu and is on the Kitto Line.

Lines

Layout 
The station consists of an island platform serving two tracks at grade with a siding. The station building is a modern flat-roofed concrete structure; formerly staffed, it is now unattended and now serves only as a waiting room. A level crossing and ramp leads to the island platform. Parking and bike sheds are available at the station forecourt.

Adjacent stations

History
Takasaki Shinden opened on the same day as one of several intermediate stations on the new track. On 6 December 1932, the same stretch was separated out and was designated as the Kitto Line with Miyakonojō as the starting point. With the privatization of Japanese National Railways (JNR), the successor of JGR, on 1 April 1987, Takasaki Shinden came under the control of JR Kyushu.

Passenger statistics
In fiscal 2016, the station was used by an average of 75 passengers (boarding only) per day.

See also
List of railway stations in Japan

References

External links
  

Railway stations in Miyazaki Prefecture
Railway stations in Japan opened in 1913